Virginia's 13th House of Delegates district elects one of the hundred delegates of the Virginia House of Delegates, the lower house of the state's bicameral legislature. The 13th district consists of Manassas Park as well as a portion of Prince William County. Its seat is currently held by Danica Roem, the first openly transgender person to be elected to the Virginia General Assembly. 

In 2017, Roem defeated Bob Marshall, a conservative Republican.

2017 election
In the 2017 off-cycle general election, Bob Marshall ran for re-election to hold his seat which he had held since 1992. His Democratic opponent was Danica Roem, who has lived in Manassas her entire life. Roem campaigned on infrastructure issues, economic development, a minimum wage increase, school funding reform and civil rights issues. Commenting on Marshall's proposed bill to regulate use of restrooms in schools, at highway rest stops, and in other government buildings, Roem said that Marshall's "legislative priorities are more concerned with where I go to the bathroom than how his constituents get to work." 

On November 7, 2017 during the general election, Roem defeated Republican incumbent Bob Marshall by a wide margin, making Roem the first openly transgender person to be elected to the Virginia Assembly and the highest-elected transgender person in the United States to date.

District officeholders

Electoral history
As of the 2010 census, a total of 80,579 civilians reside within Virginia's thirteenth state house district.

Primary results

General election results

See also
Virginia's 13th House of Delegates district election, 2017

References

013
Manassas Park, Virginia
Prince William County, Virginia